Than Than Swe is a Burmese civil servant who currently serving as the governor of Central Bank of Myanmar. She was appointed as one of two vice-governors of the Central Bank on 4 February 2021, three days after the military seized power by overthrowing the country’s democratically elected government. She was also appointed as the leader of a board to supervise dollars and gold. Than Than Swe was the target of a failed assassination attempt by anti-regime resistance fighters during a public outrage over a new Central Bank decree ordering the sale of all U.S. dollars and other foreign currencies at a fixed rate to licensed banks. She became the highest-ranking official of the regime to be attacked. On 19 August 2022, he State Administration Council appointed Than Than Swe as governor of the Central Bank of Myanmar, replacing Than Nyein.

References 

1967 births
Living people
Burmese civil servants